Peter van Nieuwenhuizen (born October 26, 1938) is a Dutch physicist.  He is now a distinguished Professor at Stony Brook University in the United States.  Van Nieuwenhuizen is best known for his discovery of supergravity with Sergio Ferrara and Daniel Z. Freedman.

Life and career
Peter van Nieuwenhuizen studied physics and mathematics at the University of Utrecht, where he obtained in 1971 his Ph.D. under the supervision of later Nobel laureate Martinus Veltman. After his studies in Utrecht he went to CERN (Geneva), the University of Paris in Orsay, and Brandeis University (Waltham), each for two years. In 1975 he joined the Institute for Theoretical Physics, now named C. N. Yang Institute for Theoretical Physics, of the Stony Brook University, where he succeeded Nobel laureate C. N. Yang as its director from 1999 till 2002.

He is married to Marie de Crombrugghe, and they have three children.

Awards and honors
For constructing supergravity, the first supersymmetric extension of Einstein's theory of general relativity, and for their central role in its subsequent development
Peter van Nieuwenhuizen, Sergio Ferrara and Daniel Z. Freedman received in 1993 the Dirac medal from the International Centre for Theoretical Physics in Trieste (Italy), in 2006 the Dannie Heineman Prize for Mathematical Physics of the American Physical Society and in 2016 the Ettore Majorana Medal from EMFCSC, Erice.  In 2019 the three were awarded a special Breakthrough Prize in Fundamental Physics of $3 million for the discovery.

He is a fellow of the American Physical Society, and a corresponding member of the Royal Netherlands Academy of Arts and Sciences since 1994, and of the Austrian Academy of Sciences. He was made a Knight in the Order of the Dutch Lion in 2004, and Honorary professor of the Technical University of Vienna (Austria) in 2005.

References

External links

 

1938 births
Living people
20th-century Dutch physicists
Stony Brook University faculty
Scientists from Utrecht (city)
Utrecht University alumni
Theoretical physicists
People associated with CERN
Members of the Royal Netherlands Academy of Arts and Sciences